Kumara is a town on the West Coast of the South Island of New Zealand. The Taramakau River flows past to the north.

The population was 285 in the 2018 census, a decrease of 24 (7.76%) from 2013.

The name may come from the Māori language Kohe mara, which is the blossom of the tātarāmoa, or bush lawyer.

The Coast to Coast annual multisport race starts at Kumara Beach.

History
The tramline from Greymouth to Paroa was extended to Kumara the following year. The population was 4,220 in October 1877. The town became a borough in 1877. Kumara Hospital was operating by 1881 and continued into the twentieth century. In 1882, the Kumara volunteer fire brigade was formed.

Kumara was the home town of prominent politician Richard Seddon, who was elected mayor of the town in 1877, and served as Prime Minister of New Zealand from 1893 until his death in 1906.

In 1925, the manager of Pearns Hotel in Kumara was charged by police after she refused to supply accommodation to two visiting temperance lecturers. The Pearn's Brewery became part of Westland Ales around this time.

Although the town once had 50 pubs, the numbers dwindled. In June 2009, the last remaining pub, the Empire Hotel, had its licence cancelled by the Liquor Licensing Authority. In 2010, the last store of the town faced closure, with only a few hundred inhabitants left, but it was hoped that one of the New Zealand Cycle Trails to run through the town would lift the settlement's fortunes again. In November 2012 the Theatre Royal Hotel reopened as the only pub serving Kumara, and in November 2013 the West Coast Wilderness Trail cycleway running from Greymouth to Ross was officially opened with a ceremony in Kumara.

Demographics
The population of Kumara was 285 in the 2018 census, a decrease of 24 from 2013. There were 141 males and 141 females. 92.6% of people identified as European/Pākehā, 11.6% as Māori, 2.1% as Pacific peoples and 3.2% as Asian. 13.7% were under 15 years old, 10.5% were 15–29, 56.8% were 30–64, and 20.0% were 65 or older.

There were 522 households. There were 639 males and 591 females, giving a sex ratio of 1.08 males per female. The median age was 49.8 years (compared with 37.4 years nationally), with 183 people (14.8%) aged under 15 years, 132 (10.7%) aged 15 to 29, 705 (57.2%) aged 30 to 64, and 210 (17.0%) aged 65 or older.

Ethnicities were 89.1% European/Pākehā, 13.6% Māori, 1.0% Pacific peoples, 3.2% Asian, and 3.4% other ethnicities (totals add to more than 100% since people could identify with multiple ethnicities).

The proportion of people born overseas was 12.4%, compared with 27.1% nationally.

Although some people objected to giving their religion, 49.9% had no religion, 37.2% were Christian, 0.5% were Hindu, 0.2% were Muslim and 1.9% had other religions.

Of those at least 15 years old, 147 (14.0%) people had a bachelor or higher degree, and 249 (23.7%) people had no formal qualifications. The median income was $31,000, compared with $31,800 nationally. The employment status of those at least 15 was that 546 (52.0%) people were employed full-time, 171 (16.3%) were part-time, and 24 (2.3%) were unemployed.

Former swimming pool 

In 1934, a community swimming pool was constructed using voluntary labour. The pool was built during the 1930s depression when mining activity and the population of the area had both declined. The pool was built in the unique surroundings of debris left behind from old gold diggings, with the walls made from  boulders from the diggings. Water for the pool was conveyed  from the Dillmanstown Kapitea Reservoir using old iron pipes recovered from historic sluicing schemes. The pool was originally part of a sports complex for the township including a basketball court and a cricket pitch. The pool is no longer in use but the area has been registered with Heritage New Zealand as a Category 2 listed place.

Notable buildings

Bank of New Zealand 
The Bank of New Zealand was first established in Kumara in 1876.

St Patrick's Catholic Church 
St Patrick's was built by the parishioners in 1877.

Education

References

Westland District
Populated places in the West Coast, New Zealand